In geometry, parallel transport (or parallel translation) is a way of transporting geometrical data along smooth curves in a manifold.  If the manifold is equipped with an affine connection (a covariant derivative or connection on the tangent bundle), then this connection allows one to transport vectors of the manifold along curves so that they stay parallel with respect to the connection.

The parallel transport for a connection thus supplies a way of, in some sense, moving the local geometry of a manifold along a curve: that is, of connecting the geometries of nearby points.  There may be many notions of parallel transport available, but a specification of one — one way of connecting up the geometries of points on a curve — is tantamount to providing a connection.  In fact, the usual notion of connection is the infinitesimal analog of parallel transport.  Or, vice versa, parallel transport is the local realization of a connection.

As parallel transport supplies a local realization of the connection, it also supplies a local realization of the curvature known as holonomy.  The Ambrose–Singer theorem makes explicit this relationship between the curvature and holonomy.

Other notions of connection come equipped with their own parallel transportation systems as well. For instance, a Koszul connection in a vector bundle also allows for the parallel transport of vectors in much the same way as with a covariant derivative.  An Ehresmann or Cartan connection supplies a lifting of curves from the manifold to the total space of a principal bundle.  Such curve lifting may sometimes be thought of as the parallel transport of reference frames.

Parallel transport on a vector bundle
Let M be a smooth manifold. Let E→M be a vector bundle with covariant derivative ∇ and γ: I→M a smooth curve parameterized by an open interval I.  A section  of  along γ is called parallel if

Suppose we are given an element e0 ∈ EP at P = γ(0) ∈ M, rather than a section. The parallel transport of e0 along γ is the extension of e0 to a parallel section X on γ.
More precisely, X is the unique part of E along γ such that 

Note that in any given coordinate patch, (1) defines an ordinary differential equation, with the initial condition given by (2).  Thus the Picard–Lindelöf theorem guarantees the existence and uniqueness of the solution.

Thus the connection ∇ defines a way of moving elements of the fibers along a curve, and this provides linear isomorphisms between the fibers at points along the curve:

from the vector space lying over γ(s) to that over γ(t).  This isomorphism is known as the parallel transport map associated to the curve.  The isomorphisms between fibers obtained in this way will, in general, depend on the choice of the curve: if they do not, then parallel transport along every curve can be used to define parallel sections of E over all of M. This is only possible if the curvature of ∇ is zero.

In particular, parallel transport around a closed curve starting at a point x defines an automorphism of the tangent space at x which is not necessarily trivial. The parallel transport automorphisms defined by all closed curves based at x form a transformation group called the holonomy group of ∇ at x. There is a close relation between this group and the value of the curvature of ∇ at x; this is the content of the Ambrose–Singer holonomy theorem.

Recovering the connection from the parallel transport

Given a covariant derivative ∇, the parallel transport along a curve γ is obtained by integrating the condition . Conversely, if a suitable notion of parallel transport is available, then a corresponding connection can be obtained by differentiation.

Consider an assignment to each curve γ in the manifold a collection of mappings

such that
 , the identity transformation of Eγ(s).
 
 The dependence of Γ on γ, s, and t is "smooth."
The notion of smoothness in condition 3. is somewhat difficult to pin down (see the discussion below of parallel transport in fibre bundles).  In particular, modern authors such as Kobayashi and Nomizu generally view the parallel transport of the connection as coming from a connection in some other sense, where smoothness is more easily expressed.

Nevertheless, given such a rule for parallel transport, it is possible to recover the associated infinitesimal connection in E as follows.  Let γ be a differentiable curve in M with initial point γ(0) and initial tangent vector X = γ′(0).  If V is a section of E over γ, then let

This defines the associated infinitesimal connection ∇ on E. One recovers the same parallel transport Γ from this infinitesimal connection.

Special case: the tangent bundle

Let M be a smooth manifold. Then a connection on the tangent bundle of M, called an affine connection, distinguishes a class of curves called (affine) geodesics.  A smooth curve γ: I → M is an affine geodesic if  is parallel transported along , that is

Taking the derivative with respect to time, this takes the more familiar form

Parallel transport in Riemannian geometry

In (pseudo) Riemannian geometry, a metric connection is any connection whose parallel transport mappings preserve the metric tensor.  Thus a metric connection is any connection Γ such that, for any two vectors X, Y ∈ Tγ(s)

Taking the derivative at t = 0, the associated differential operator ∇ must satisfy a product rule with respect to the metric:

Geodesics

If ∇ is a metric connection, then the affine geodesics are the usual geodesics of Riemannian geometry and are the locally distance minimizing curves.

It follows from an application of Gauss's lemma that if A is the norm of  then the distance, induced by the metric, between two close enough points on the curve γ, say γ(t1) and γ(t2), is given by

The formula above might not be true for points which are not close enough since the geodesic might for example wrap around the manifold (e.g. on a sphere).

Generalizations
The parallel transport can be defined in greater generality for other types of connections, not just those defined in a vector bundle.  One generalization is for principal connections .  Let P →  M be a principal bundle over a manifold M with structure Lie group G and a principal connection ω. As in the case of vector bundles, a principal connection ω on P defines, for each curve γ in M, a mapping

from the fibre over γ(s) to that over γ(t), which is an isomorphism of homogeneous spaces: i.e.  for each g∈G.

Further generalizations of parallel transport are also possible.  In the context of Ehresmann connections, where the connection depends on a special notion of "horizontal lifting" of tangent spaces, one can define parallel transport via horizontal lifts.  Cartan connections are Ehresmann connections with additional structure which allows the parallel transport to be thought of as a map "rolling" a certain model space along a curve in the manifold.  This rolling is called development.

Approximation: Schild's ladder

Parallel transport can be discretely approximated by Schild's ladder,
which takes finite steps along a curve, and approximates
Levi-Civita parallelogramoids by approximate parallelograms.

See also
 Basic introduction to the mathematics of curved spacetime
 Connection (mathematics)
 Development (differential geometry)
 Affine connection
 Covariant derivative
 Geodesic (general relativity)
 Geometric phase
 Lie derivative
 Schild's ladder
 Levi-Civita parallelogramoid
 parallel curve, similarly named, but different notion

Notes

Citations

References

 
 
 ; Volume 2, .

External links

 Spherical Geometry Demo. An applet demonstrating parallel transport of tangent vectors on a sphere.

Riemannian geometry
Connection (mathematics)